Mont des Cats is a small hill (alt. 164m) near the town of Godewaersvelde, France. Located in the Nord department, its Flemish name is Katsberg.
The hill is seat of the Mont des Cats abbey, famous for its cheese produced by monks since 1890. 

Atop the hill rests an antenna that reaches a height of 364m and transmits both television and radio signals. It transmits FM radio signals at 500 W and has three ultra-high frequency 80 kW transmitters for TV broadcasting.

The antenna provides radio and television for part of the Nord Pas de Calais digital television (DTT).

The traditional feast of Saint-Hubert is held atop this hill on the third Sunday in October.

Origin of the name 
The name has nothing to do with cats, but is derived from the name of a Germanic tribe known as Chatti (French: Chattes;  Dutch; Chatten), living in the area after the fall of the Roman Empire (5th century).

Mont des Cats Abbey 

A first community of the Hospital Brothers of St. Anthony was settled in 1650 and lasted until the French Revolution which closed the monastery in 1792. In 1826, a new community of Trappists (Reformed Cistercians) was established, and this congregation has run the abbey ever since. A breakaway group of Trappist monks left Mont des Cats and settled in Westvleteren (Belgium).

World War One 
During World War One the abbey was the scene of much action, particularly in 1914 during the Battle of Messines. On 12th October, 1914, the British 3rd Cavalry Bridge consisting of 4th Hussars, 5th Royal Irish Lancers and 16th Lancers attacked Mont des Cats, against Germans who were dug in on Mont des Cats and at Flêtre. They advanced up the slopes covered in hop-fields towards the monastery on the hilltop, with dismounted cavalry attacking from the west and mounted cavalry with a battery of horse artillery from the south. After some hard fighting, the monastery was wrested from German hands. During this engagement, Prince Maximilian Friedrich Wilhelm Georg von Hesse was mortally wounded and died in the monastery later that night. The 5th Lancers occupied the monastery that night along with some German wounded.

Mont des Cats cheese 
Mont des Cats cheese has been produced by the monks since 1890 with the milk of local farms, in a small independent dairy.
The production method are similar to those used for Port-salut. Affinage (maturing) takes a minimum of one month and during this period the cheese is washed in salted water and dyed with roucou, a reddish derivative from annatto seeds. The texture of the cheese is firm, uncooked, pressed and has small holes. The fat content is 50%.
In Flanders it is sometimes eaten as a breakfast cheese with coffee.

Cycling 

The Mont des Cats is regularly included in cycling races in spring, such as Gent–Wevelgem and the Four Days of Dunkirk. It featured once in the Tour de France.

See also 
Mont des Cats has inspired the name of the software company Mondeca.

References 

Trappist monasteries in France
Buildings and structures in Nord (French department)